Miriam Lanta (born 22 December 1972) is a Papua New Guinean former footballer. She has been the Papua New Guinea women's national team.

Notes

References

1972 births
Living people
Papua New Guinean women's footballers
Papua New Guinea women's international footballers
Women's association footballers not categorized by position